Parlez-Vous English? is the seventh album by psychedelic rock group, The Edgar Broughton Band, or "The Broughtons" as they are credited on this release. The album was created after serious legal action, which occurred during the release of their previous album Bandages; this resulted with the band splitting up for four years before finally reuniting under a different moniker, "The Broughtons". The album was originally released as Infinity INS 3027 in 1979, and saw the band on new label, Infinity Records and with a more punk/rock sound, as opposed to their other psychedelic rock releases. The album was remastered in 2006.

Track listing
All tracks composed by Edgar Broughton; except where indicated
Side one
"Little One" - 3:10
"Waiting for You" - 3:57
"Drivin' to Nowhere" (Steve Broughton) - 3:32
"Meglamaster" - 1:58
"Didecoi" - 2:31
"April in England" - 3:16
Side two
"Revelations One" - 2:45
"Anthem" - 2:46
"Down in the Jungle" - 2:43
"Rentasong" - 2:58
"Young Boys" (Steve Broughton) - 3:31
"All I Want to Be" - 4:10

Personnel
Adapted from AllMusic.
Edgar Broughton Band
Edgar Broughton - lead vocals, guitars, Moog synthesiser, effects, backing vocals, percussion
Arthur Grant - bass guitar, backing vocals, percussion
Steve Broughton - drums, lead vocals (tracks 3 & 11), backing vocals, percussion
Richard de Bastion - keyboards, backing vocals
Pete Tolson - guitars
Tom Nordon - slide guitar, guitars, backing vocals
Additional musicians
Allan Smith - saxophone (track 5)
Peter Hope-Evans - harmonica (tracks 5 & 10)
Suzie O'List - vocals (tracks 1 & 11)
Loz Broughton - vocals (tracks 5, 7 & 8)
Shazzi Scoot - vocals (tracks 1, 3, 8 & 11)
Sally Broughton - "Girls" (track 6)
Ali Kimball - "Girls" (track 6)
Tamara Kimball - "Girls" (track 6)
Shelley Watson - "Girls" (track 6)
Kay Karnera - "Girls" (track 6)
Sonja Girls - "Girls" (track 6)
Vicki Gaffee - cello (track 12)
Technical
John Leckie, Simon Heyworth - production assistance

References

Albums with cover art by Hipgnosis
Edgar Broughton Band albums
1979 albums